The  is a Japanese multinational manufacturer and marketer of vacuum flasks, beverage dispensers, and consumer electronics including bread machines, electric kettles, hot water dispensers, electric water boilers and rice cookers.  It has a branch in South Korea and subsidiary companies in Taiwan, China, Hong Kong, and the United States. Zojirushi is listed on the Tokyo Stock Exchange.

The company was founded in 1918 as the Ichikawa Brothers Trading Company in Osaka and in 1948 was changed to Kyowa Manufacturing Co., Ltd.  In 1961, its name was changed again from Kyowa Manufacturing Co., Ltd to the Zojirushi Corporation and its corporate logo, including an elephant (Zōjirushi means "elephant mark"), was adopted.

References

External links

Zojirushi Worldwide corporate website
Zojirushi America Corporation website
Zojirushi South East Asia website

Companies listed on the Tokyo Stock Exchange
Home appliance brands
Home appliance manufacturers of Japan
Companies based in Osaka Prefecture
Japanese companies established in 1918
Electronics companies established in 1918
Manufacturing companies established in 1918
Japanese brands
Multinational companies headquartered in Japan
Midori-kai
Vacuum flasks